Watchimals were a wearable toy, marketed mainly for girls, with a LCD watch inside. They were made by Hasbro in their heyday of the mid-1980s. Watchimals took the form of furry wristbands with different animal heads. When the animal head was flipped open, the digital watch appeared. The advertisement slogan was: "Just open his mouth and he'll show you the time! 
They're all soft animal friends with a real watch inside!"

Series
Beginning in 1985, Watchimals were produced in two series.

First Series
The first series included six characters: 
Elephant
Bear
Toucan
Peacock 
Mouse 
Butterfly

Second Series
In 1986, six more characters were added:
Snail 
Dragonfly
Dog
Goldfish
Unicorn 
Moose

Overseas Editions 
Another Watchimal, Ladybird was primarily marketed in the United Kingdom.  Other international Watchimals had different color schemes than those in the United States.

Related Series: Wearimals 
Wearimals were pairs of furry animals, also made by Hasbro, made in the same style as Watchimals. Wearimals were about the same size as Watchimals and could be mixed and matched. They included a clip for attaching onto hair, clothes, and schoolbags. There were six Wearimals:
Butterfly
Cat
Goldfish
Peacock
Pig
Snail

References

External links 
 Watchimal Collectors Website
 Ghost of the Doll - Watchimals

1980s toys
Hasbro products
Electronic toys
Toy animals